The 2021 NCAA Division I Women's Lacrosse Championship was the 39th annual single-elimination tournament to determine the national champion of Division I NCAA women's college lacrosse. The semifinal and championship rounds were played at Johnny Unitas Stadium in Towson, MD from May 28–30, 2021. All other rounds were played at campus sites, usually at the home field of the higher-seeded team, from May 14–22. This marked the return of the tournament after 2020 was cancelled due to the COVID-19 pandemic.

Tournament field
All NCAA Division I women's lacrosse programs were eligible for this championship, and a total of 29 teams were invited to participate. 15 teams qualified automatically by winning their conference tournaments while the remaining 14 teams qualified at-large based on their regular season records.

Seeds

1. North Carolina (18-0)
2. Northwestern (13-0)
3. Syracuse (14-3)
4. Boston College (13-3)
5. Notre Dame (9-6)
6. Florida (16-2)
7. Duke (9-7)
8. Stony Brook (14-2)

Teams

Bracket

Tournament bracket
Games on Conference Sports Networks (BTN & BTN+) or ESPN3 for First & Second Rounds. Semifinals on ESPNews & Finals on ESPNU.

*First and second round host.

See also 
 NCAA Division II Women's Lacrosse Championship 
 NCAA Division III Women's Lacrosse Championship
 NCAA Division I Men's Lacrosse Championship

References

NCAA Division I Women's Lacrosse Championship
NCAA Women's Lacrosse Championship
Lacrosse
NCAA Division I Women's Lacrosse
NCAA

Copied content from 2019 NCAA Division I Women's Lacrosse Championship; see that page's history for attribution